The Elliott 6m is an Olympic-class keelboat, designed by New Zealander, Greg Elliott. It was selected for the women's match racing event for the 2012 Olympics.  The Elliott 6m carries a spinnaker pole and symmetric spinnaker which is considered more suitable for match racing.

Olympics 
Sailing at the 2012 Summer Olympics

See also
Elliott 6m World Championships

References

External links

 Elliott Marine
  ISAF Elliott 6m Microsite

 
Classes of World Sailing
Keelboats
Olympic sailing classes
2000s sailboat type designs